Admiral Madhvendra Singh, PVSM, AVSM, ADC was Chief of Naval Staff of the Indian Navy between 29 December 2001 and his retirement from service on 31 July 2004. He had by that date completed over 41 years of service. He was also the Chairman of the Chiefs of Staff Committee from 2002 to 2004

Career
Madhvendra Singh is a son of Major General K Bhagwati Singh and was educated at St. Xavier's School, Jaipur, in the Indian state of Rajasthan. His military career began in July 1958 when he joined the National Defence Academy, from which he moved to the Indian Navy in January 1963.

He won various awards early in his naval career and chose to specialise in Gunnery, for which purpose he subsequently attended courses at the National Defence College in New Delhi, as well as abroad at institutions such as the Royal Military College of Science at Shrivenham, United Kingdom, the Defence Services Staff College in Wellington, Tamil Nadu and the Naval War College at Newport, USA. He was promoted to lieutenant-commander on 16 February 1973 and to commander on 1 July 1977.

He also commanded the Naval Academy at Kochi. He was promoted to captain on 1 July 1983, and was promoted rear admiral on 13 September 1990.

Active service operations in which Singh was involved include the 1961 actions in Goa and in both the 1965 and 1971 Indo-Pakistani wars. His later operations included the 1987 Operation Pawan in Sri Lanka and acting as commander of the Western Maritime Theatre during the Kargil War of 1999.

Singh has been awarded both the Param Vishist Seva Medal and the Ati Vishist Seva Medal for his service.

Family
He is married to Kaumudi Kumari and has a daughter and a son.

Awards and decorations

References

|-

|-

|-

|-

Chiefs of the Naval Staff (India)
Vice Chiefs of Naval Staff (India)
Indian Navy admirals
Deputy Chiefs of Naval Staff (India)
Flag Officers Commanding Western Fleet
People from Jaipur district
1945 births
Living people
Naval War College alumni
Commandants of the Indian Naval Academy
National Defence College, India alumni
Defence Services Staff College alumni
Academic staff of the Defence Services Staff College